The Mughal invasion of Bengal was an invasion of the Sultanate of Bengal, then ruled by the Afghan Karrani dynasty, by the Mughal Empire in 1572–1576. After a series of intense battles, the Mughals eventually defeated the Sultanate of Bengal in the Battle of Raj Mahal in 1576, and annexed the region into their empire as the province of Bengal.

See also 
 Delhite invasion of Bengal (1353-1354)
 Delhite invasion of Bengal (1358-1360)

References 

Conflicts in 1572
Conflicts in 1573
Conflicts in 1574
Conflicts in 1575
Conflicts in 1576
1572 in Asia
1573 in Asia
1574 in Asia
1575 in Asia
1576 in Asia
Military history of India
Battles involving the Indian kingdoms
Bengal
Military history of the Bengal Sultanate
Wars involving the Mughal Empire